Chornice is a municipality and village in Svitavy District in the Pardubice Region of the Czech Republic. It has about 900 inhabitants.

Notable people
František Mašlaň (born 1933), ice hockey player

References

Villages in Svitavy District